Oakridge International School is an International Baccalaureate affiliated school located in Hyderabad, India. Oakridge International School provides the IBDP and CBSE syllabus. The school has stopped the IGSE syllabus recently and has introduced the IBDP . The students receive a diploma at the end of pre-primary. It has five day-schools in Hyderabad, Bangalore, Mohali and one boarding campus in Visakhapatnam city. The school has recently been acquired by Nord Anglia Education.

History

The school was established by educationist Shomie Das in 2001. The school opened on June 11th 2001 in rented premises in Jubilee Hills.
 
In 2002 the campus moved to Khajaguda, Hyderabad. The school has over 3000 students.

In 2019 Oakridge International was acquired by Nord Anglia Education for an estimated price of about ₹16 billion.

References

External links

 

International schools in Hyderabad, India
Cambridge schools in India
High schools and secondary schools in Hyderabad, India
Educational institutions established in 2001
2001 establishments in Andhra Pradesh